The Women's Junior Pan-American Volleyball Cup is a bi-annual Continental Cup organized by NORCECA for U21 teams from all over America (North-, South- and Central America, and the Caribbean)

History

Medal table

MVP by edition
2011 –  Daniela Uribe
2013 –  Alejandra Isiordia
2015 –  Gaila González
2017 –  Thayer Hall
2019 –  Ailama Cese
2022 –  Merrit Beason

See also
 Women's Pan-American Volleyball Cup
 Women's U23 Pan-American Volleyball Cup
 Girls' Youth Pan-American Volleyball Cup
 Men's Junior Pan-American Volleyball Cup

References

External links
 NORCECA

Pan-American Volleyball Cup
Women's Pan-American Volleyball Cup
Recurring sporting events established in 2011